MacKinley Helm (1896–1963) was an American writer and collector.

Among his friends during this period were Ines Amor, Alfred Barr, Henry Klifford, Federico Cantú, and William Spratling, which placed MacKinley Helm in a good position to write about these artists, and his book is now considered the best introduction to the art and artists of Mexico during the great artistic movements of the twenties and thirties.

Helm married Frances Lathrop Hammond (1894–1973).

Books
1936: After Pentecost: a history of Christian ideas and institutions from Peter and Paul to Ignatius of Antioch. New York: Harper
1941: Modern Mexican Painters. New York: Harper
1942: Angel Mo' and her son, Roland Hayes. Boston: Little, Brown
1946: A Matter of Love, and other baroque tales of the provinces. New York: Harper
1948: John Marin. Boston: Pellegrini & Cudahy (reissued: New York: Kennedy; Da Capo Press, 1970)
1948: Journeying through Mexico. Boston: Little, Brown
1949: A Month of Sundays, and other baroque tales of the provinces. London: Harvill Press
1953: Spring in Spain. London: Gollancz
1953: Man of Fire; J. C. Orozco: an interpretative memoir. Boston: Institute of Contemporary Art
1956: Fray Junipero Serra: the great walker. Stanford, Calif.: Stanford University Press (play)
 1943: Story of Pipila

References

1896 births
1963 deaths
American art critics
American art collectors